Helmut Donner (born 15 August 1941) is an Austrian athlete. He competed in the men's high jump at the 1960 Summer Olympics.

References

1941 births
Living people
Athletes (track and field) at the 1960 Summer Olympics
Austrian male high jumpers
Olympic athletes of Austria
Place of birth missing (living people)